The Lives of Others, a 2006 German thriller, marks the feature film debut of director and screenwriter Florian Henckel von Donnersmarck and stars Ulrich Mühe. It has received numerous awards and nominations.

References

External links
 

Lives of Others